Amy Olson née Anderson (born July 10, 1992) is an American professional golfer on the LPGA Tour. She turned professional in 2013 after her collegiate career at North Dakota State University where she won an NCAA record 20 collegiate events.

Amateur career
Anderson won numerous local, state, and regional competitions with her most notable win coming in 2009 at the U.S. Girl's Junior at Trump National in Bedminster, New Jersey. In 2011 she was the first woman to compete in the KX Bank of the West Amateur Tournament.

College career
Anderson competed at North Dakota State University, where she led the women's golf program in scoring each of her four years. She won 20 collegiate events, which beat Juli Inkster's NCAA record of 17 events. In addition to her performance on the golf course, Anderson held a 3.97 GPA in accounting and won the Elite 89 Award as a sophomore, being the student-athlete with the highest GPA (4.0) at the national championship.

Professional career
After completing her senior season at NDSU, Anderson turned professional and won Stage II of LPGA Qualifying school. She gained her LPGA Tour card in June 2013 to be part of the rookie class in 2014. Her best finish of the year came at the LPGA Lotte Championship in Hawaii, where she finished tied for 7th.

In 2018, Olson made the final pairing at the ANA Inspiration, and picked up her first top-10 in a major there as she tied for 9th. At The Evian Championship, Olson came close to making her first LPGA victory a major championship, but after at least sharing the lead for most of the final day, she lost to Angela Stanford on the 18th hole with a double bogey. By the end of 2018, she posted a career-best four top-10 finishes in 24 starts, and passed the $1 million mark in career earnings with her T10 finish at the CME Group Tour Championship.

Olson started her 2019 season sharing a five-way tie for tenth in the ISPS Handa Women's Australian Open, and a tie for fifth in the HSBC Women's World Championship.

Personal life
She was born in Oxbow, North Dakota to Mark and Twyla Anderson. She has one sibling, Nathan Anderson, who competed on North Dakota State University's men's golf team. She was home schooled through high school before attending North Dakota State University herself at the age of 17.  she competes under her married name, Amy Olson.

Olson is married to Grant Olson. She is a Christian.

Results in LPGA majors
Results not in chronological order before 2019.

^ The Evian Championship was added as a major in 2013.

LA = low amateur
CUT = missed the half-way cut
NT = no tournament
"T" = tied

Summary

Most consecutive cuts made – 6 (2017 Evian – 2019 ANA)
Longest streak of top-10s – 1 (three times)

Team appearances
Amateur
Curtis Cup (representing the United States): 2012

References

External links 

Amy Anderson at the official North Dakota State University athletics site

American female golfers
LPGA Tour golfers
Golfers from North Dakota
North Dakota State Bison athletes
People from Cass County, North Dakota
1992 births
Living people
21st-century American women
20th-century American women